National Technical University of Ukraine "Igor Sikorsky Kyiv Polytechnic Institute" (NTUU KPI) is a public technological university located in Kyiv, Ukraine.

Name
1898–1918 Kiev Polytechnic Institute of Emperor Alexander II
1918–1934 Kyiv Polytechnic Institute
1934–1948 Kyiv Industrial Institute
1948–1968 Order of Lenin Kyiv Polytechnic Institute
1968–1992 Order of Lenin Kyiv Polytechnic Institute in memory of the 50th anniversary of the Great October Socialist Revolution
1992–1995 Kyiv Polytechnic Institute
1995–2016 National Technical University of Ukraine "Kyiv Polytechnic Institute"
2016— National Technical University of Ukraine "Igor Sikorsky Kyiv Polytechnic Institute"

History

The institute was founded as the Kyiv Polytechnic Institute of Emperor Alexander II on 31 August 1898. However, the construction of the current building complex was finished in 1902. Until then, the institute was renting out its space at the building of Commercial School located on Vorovsky Street. At that time, it had four departments: Mechanical, Chemical, Agricultural, and Civil Engineering. The first enrolment constituted of 360 students. The leading Russian scientists Dmitri Mendeleev, Nikolai Zhukovsky and Kliment Arkadyevich Timiryazev provided substantial scientific and organizational assistance in the founding of the institute.

Viktor Kyrpychov was the first rector of the KPI. It was largely due to Kyrpychov's efforts that such professors like V.P. Yermakov, S.M. Reformatsky, M.I. Konovalov or Vladimir Zworykin became members of the first faculty.

Since its establishing the institute was involved in the 1899 All-Russian student strike, which resulted in arrest and exile of 32 students. In the beginning of 1899, the underground organizational committee was established and had a close relationship with the Kyiv Council of United Communities and Organizations. 

In 1930, the Kyiv National University of Construction and Architecture (KNUCA) was established on the basis of factory and communal construction branch of the Kyiv Polytechnic Institute (KPI) and the Architectural faculty of the Kyiv Art Institute.

The deoccupation of Kyiv in November 1943 made it possible to restore the work of the institute: the registration of teachers, employees, students who returned to the institute began. Already in the second half of January 1944, an administrative commission for a set of students on the first course and renewal of senior students has begun. All efforts of the institute's team were aimed at the restoration of the teaching base, because as a result of the Nazi occupation and brutal battles for Kyiv, more than half of the total area of educational premises was destroyed, hostels burned, looted property. Thanks to the inclusion of the institute to the list of the most important industrial and transport universities of the country, students of all courses were exempted from the prize to the Soviet Army, they were provided with an increased scholarship (first of all, it concerned students who captured specialties from foundry, forging, press and chemical production). Due to construction delays in the summer of 1945, students and teachers worked voluntarily performing urgent construction tasks during vacations.

Were important for improving the quality of training Research and involvement of students, especially in senior courses. The main form of their participation in research work in the postwar years were scientific circles, on the basis of which in April 1946, a student scientific and technical society was formed in the institute. At the time of creation, it had nine sections that combine 30 circles in specialties and about 500 students. Managed sections of leading scientists of the institute.

In the history of the existence of universities, 23 rectors were headed.

In the long period of existence, the name of the institute has changed several times:

 1898-1918 - Kyiv Polytechnic Institute of Emperor Oleksandr II;       
 1918-1934 - Kyiv Polytechnic Institute;       
 1934-1948 - Kyiv Industrial Institute;       
 1948-1968 - Kyiv Order Lenin Polytechnic Institute;       
 1968-1992 - Kyiv Order Lenin Polytechnic Institute. 50th anniversary of the Great October Socialist Revolution;       
 1992-1995 - Kyiv Polytechnic Institute;       
 1995-2016 - National Technical University of Ukraine "Kyiv Polytechnic Institute". (Decree of the President of Ukraine in No. 289/95 of April 8, 1995 "On the Kyiv Polytechnic Institute");       
 2016 - National Technical University of Ukraine "Kyiv Polytechnic Institute named after Igor Sikorsky" (Order of the Ministry of Education Ministry of Internal Affairs 17.08.2016 No. 992 "On the Assignment of the National Technical University of Ukraine" Kyiv Polytechnic Institute"). The name "KPI them. Igor Sikorsky".       
Actively developing, the Kyiv Polytechnic Institute became the basis for expanding and strengthening the network of Vishivs Kyiv, Ukraine. In 1923–1933, and in recent years, several institutions, universities, academies were created on the basis of departments and individual specialties of the KPI. On the other hand, the famous educational institutions of Ukraine entered the current composition of the university. Thus in the Military Institute of Telecommunications and Informatization of NTUU "KPI" by the official date of the creation is considered March 1, 1919 - the Day of Approval of the Rev-wake of the Republic of the Republic of Projects of Engineering Courses for the preparation of the team of the Worker-Peasant Red Army, which in 1937 became the basis for the Kyiv military school of ZV The tap them. M. I. Kalinina. Publishing-Polygraphic Institute Since September 6, 2004, which included in the KPI in 1989, was founded on January 1, 1954, in Kyiv on the basis of the artistic-craft school of printers No 18, as an educational and consultative point (UCP) of the Moscow printing institute.

Organisation

Institutes
 Educational, Science, and Scientific Complex "Institute of Applied Systems Analysis" (ESC IASA);
 Educational and Research Institute of Telecommunication Systems (ITS);
 Institute of Energy Saving and Energy Management (IEE);
 Institute of Aerospace Technologies (IAT);
 Institute of Special Communication and Information Security (ISIS);
 Mechanics and Machine-Building Institute (MMI);
 Institute of Materials Science and Welding (IMZ);
 Publishing and Printing Institute (VPI)
 Physics and Engineering Institute (PTI);
 Inter-branch Institute of Post-graduate Education;
 Institute of Pre-admission education and Vocational Guidance.

Faculties 
 Applied Mathematics (FPM);
 Biomedical Engineering (FBE);
 Biotechnology and Biotechnics (FBT);
 Chemical Engineering (IHF);
 Chemical Technology (XTF);
 Electric Power Engineering and Automatics (FEA);
 Electronics (FEL);
 Heat and Power Engineering (TEF);
 Informatics and Computer Science (FIOT);
 Instrumentation Engineering (PBF);
 Linguistics (FL);
 Management and Marketing (FMM);
 Physics and Mathematics (FMF);
 Radio Engineering (RTF);
 Sociology and Law (FSP).

Facilities
The university has two campuses, the central one being located in Kyiv, and the other in town of Slavutych.

The Kyiv campus of the university is located near the city centre in a park named after the university.

Almost 9,000 students from outside Kyiv are accommodated in 21 dormitories, 3 of them for married students. The living conditions at the dormitories is a matter of numerous complaints of their inhabitants, with four people sharing a single room measuring 18 square-meters.

The institute has an outpatient medical department for employers and students.

The institute also considers organized leisure a very important factor in bringing up young specialists.

The Knowledge Square is the centre of the entire KPI complex, measuring approx. 105 x 100 meters. The Knowledge Square is connected to one of the city's main thoroughfare, Prospect Peremohy (Victory Avenue). Meetings, festivals, and graduation ceremonies take place at the square.

The university also has an assembly hall with 1,750 seats. It was opened in August 1984.

Various sport facilities also exist at the institute. There are training grounds, soccer fields, volleyball and basketball courts for student use. There are many nationally rated athletes among the students of this institute.

Some Institutes were organized on the KPI basis. Among them are: the Civil Engineering Institute, Technological Institute of Light and Food Industry, the Institute of Civil Aviation, Automobile and Road Building Institute, Agricultural (now Agricultural Academy) and others. In 1934 - 1944 the KPI was called an Industrial Institute.

Other labs and organisations 
 Scientific Society of Students and Post-graduates
 Scientific-industrial laboratory DIDAKTIK
 UNESCO Chair in Higher Technical Education, Applied System Analysis and Informatics
 State Polytechnic Museum
 University Interclub
 University Library

Summer school
The Summer school Achievements and Applications of Contemporary Informatics, Mathematics and Physics (Summer School AACIMP) is an annual international scientific-educational project of volunteers from the university's Student Science Association. It is aimed at an international audience of advanced students, postgraduates and young scientists. There are usually about 100 participants.

It has been traditionally held each August since 2006. As a rule, the duration of the project is two weeks.

Science and education community

Student life
At present the number of students at KPI is more than 36,000. Approximately 400 of them are international students. In this way students, especially those who live in a hostel, have a social life with their foreign fellow students and a chance to learn more about other cultures, people and ideas. Over 4,500 students graduate from KPI every year. The diploma is accepted by the European Union. KPI has a preparatory department for foreigners. There is a possibility to study in English and at the same time learn Ukrainian.

Full-time students attend the school for 5 years and 6 months; part-time - 5 years and 10 months.

The school offers 68 majors and 70 minors at its 3 branches. There are 16 departments and a college, including the following:
 Department of Informatics and Computer Engineering that offer courses on Electron Instrument Engineering, Cybernetics, and Control engineering and Computer engineering, among others.
 Electric Power Engineering Automation department that offers courses Electrical Networks and Electric Systems, Central Power Plants, High Voltage Technique, and Cybernetics of Electrical Systems.
 Electro-Acoustic Faculty offering courses in Hydroacoustics Sound Recording, Measuring Techniques, and Microprocessors.
 Faculty of Radioengineering
 Physical engineering department offering courses on Metallurgy, Metals and Alloys, Powder Metallurgy, and others.

Faculty staff and Academician community
About 70% of KPI teachers have scientific degrees. Among them there are Academicians and Corresponding Members of the Ukrainian Academy of Sciences, Professors, and Merited Scientists. The language of instruction is predominantly Ukrainian, with options of Russian and English also available.

A number of the university's rectors served as ministers of education, including the current rector Mykhailo Zghurovskyi.

The UNESCO CEPES (European Centre for Higher Education) ranked Kyiv Polytechnic Institute as the best university in Ukraine.

Notable alumni
A large number of prominent people worked and studied at the KPI
 Ivan Bardin, metallurgist
 Saadoun Brahim, a Kyiv Polytechnic Institute student who joined the Ukrainian Armed Forces as a fighter-volunteer
 Boris Yakovlevich Bukreev, mathematicianknown for his works in complex functions, differential equations, and non-Euclidean geometry
 Vladimir Chelomei, Soviet mechanics scientist and rocket engineer
 Valeriia Hontareva, Chairman of the National Bank of Ukraine
 , chemist
 Sergey Korolyov, rocket scientist
 Arkhip Lyulka, USSR's premier designer of jet engines
 Aleksandr Mikulin, Soviet aircraft engine designer and chief designer in the Mikulin OKB
 E.O.Paton, inventor of electric welding
 Isaak Sigal, scientist
 Igor Sikorsky, creator of Sikorsky Helicopters
 Stephen Timoshenko, reputed to be the father of modern engineering mechanics
 Oleg Tozoni, the head of the Department of Electrodynamics at the Cybernetics Institute of the Academy of Science.

Other institutes created based on KPI
 Kyiv National University of Construction and Architecture
 Kyiv National University of Technologies and Design
 Paton Institute of Electric Welding (National Academy of Sciences of Ukraine)

Recreation at KPI

The university has a well developed infrastructure of recreation and leisure, including sports, entertainment, arts, and others.

The university has a sports complex with an indoor swimming pool, a multi-hall building, and a soccer field.

The Kyiv Polytechnic Institute has been an important center of sports life in the city. Its football team "Politechniki" was one of the first football teams founded in the Russian Empire in 1906–1917.

The university has several recreational resorts throughout the country. Two resorts are located near Kyiv, one is located in Carpathian Mountains, and another near the Black Sea.

The university has its own arts center located in Center of Culture and Arts, better known by its Soviet standard name "Palace of Culture". The concert hall of KPI Center Culture and Arts is the main venue of the Ukrainian national qualification for continental song contest Eurovision.

There is a park in the grounds of the university.

International relations

The Kyiv Polytechnic Institute has foreign economic relationship with 45 foreign partners from 12 countries of the world. 29 agreements and 17 contracts have been concluded and 77 protocols have been signed: KPI received the certificate as a participant of foreign economic relationship.

The most active international scientific and technological cooperation is carried out by the chairs of the institute with the partners from Poland, Germany, Bulgaria, Denmark and Lebanon. Lately the relationship with China, United States, Italy, Vietnam and Spain have become more active. The institute carries out the exchange of students according to the agreement on cooperation with the University of Oregon, United States.

KPI was the first university of Ukraine that joined the community of the European Universities, and signed the Magna Charta Universitatum in September 2003.

Friendly schools
Selected Co-operations
 University of Klagenfurt (Austria)
 University of Antwerp (Belgium)
 Anhui University of Technology (China)
 Otto von Guericke University of Magdeburg (Germany)
 University of Miskolc (Hungary)
 University of Manchester (United Kingdom)
 Iowa State University (United States)
 University of Oregon (United States)
 University of Wisconsin-Madison (United States)

Rectors

 1898 — 1902 Viktor Kirpichov
 1902 — 1904 Mikhail Konovalov
 1904 — 1905 Konstantin Zvorykin
 1905 — 1906 Mykola Chyrvynskyi
 1906 — 1908 Volodymyr Tymofeyev
 1908 — 1911 Konstantin Dementiev
 1911 — 1917 Ivan Zhukov
 1917 — 1919 Petro Yerchenko
 1919 — 1920 George De Metz
 1920 — 1921 Serhiy Veselovskyi
 1921 — 1921 Ivan Kukharenko
 1921 — 1929 Viktorin Bobrov
 1929 — 1930 Dmitriy Melnikov
 1930 — 1934 unknown
 1934 — 1936 Mykola Yefimov
 1936 — 1937 Pavlo Zhykharev
 1937 — 1941 Mykola Shpylko
 1941 — 1942 Mykola Velychkivskyi
 1942 — 1944 unknown
 1944 — 1952 Oleksandr Plyhunov
 1952 — 1955 Vitaliy Gridnyev
 1955 — 1955 Ivan Shvets
 1955 — 1971 Oleksandr Plyhunov
 1971 — 1987 Hryhoriy Denysenko
 1987 — 1992 Petro Talanchuk
 1992 — present Mykhailo Zghurovskyi

Rating

National Technical University of Ukraine "Kyiv Polytechnic Institute" positions in national and international ratings of the best Ukrainian educational institutions, employers ratings, etc.:

Ukrainian university academic rating "TOP – 200 Ukraine" (2022)- 2nd place.
Ukrainian employers rating "Compass" - 1st place.
World universities ranking "Webometrics" – 713rd place (2012), 510th (2013), 1538th (2022)
QS World University Ranking – 701+

Scientific journals 
 Radioelectronics and Communications Systems
 System Research and Information Technologies
 KPI Science News (Naukovi visti NTUU KPI)
 Visnyk NTUU KPI: Informatics, operation and computer science

References

External links
 
 
 Ukrayna Ulusal Teknik Üniversitesi Kiev Politeknik Enstitüsü 
 KPI history
 Blog KPI
 Student Council Campus in Kyiv Polytechnic Institute in Ukrainian
 Campus Map

 
Universities and colleges in Kyiv
Technical universities and colleges in Ukraine
National universities in Ukraine
Educational institutions established in 1898
Prospect Beresteiskyi
Solomianskyi District
1898 establishments in the Russian Empire
Institutions with the title of National in Ukraine